A by-election for the Australian House of Representatives seat of Bennelong was held on 16 December 2017.

Previous incumbent and Liberal candidate John Alexander won the by-election despite a 4.8 percentage point two-party swing to Labor candidate Kristina Keneally which made the seat marginal.

Background
Amid the 2017–18 Australian parliamentary eligibility crisis, the trigger for the by-election was the resignation of Liberal incumbent John Alexander effective 11 November 2017. Following the increased media attention on the citizenship status of parliamentarians, Alexander asked British authorities for evidence of his British-born father renouncing British citizenship. They were unable to find any, leaving Alexander unable to demonstrate he was not a British citizen by descent, meaning he would be ineligible under Section 44 of the Constitution to sit in the Parliament of Australia. Alexander subsequently renounced his British citizenship, in order to nominate for election again.

Speaker of the House of Representatives Tony Smith issued the writ for the election on 13 November 2017, the same day that Alexander submitted his resignation.

Key dates
 Saturday 11 November 2017 – Speaker acceptance of resignation 
 Monday 13 November 2017 – Issue of writ
 Monday 20 November 2017 – Close of electoral rolls (8pm)
 Thursday 23 November 2017 – Close of nominations (12 noon)
 Friday 24 November 2017 – Declaration of nominations (12 noon)
 Tuesday 28 November 2017 – Start of early voting
 Saturday 16 December 2017 – Polling day (8am to 6pm)
 Friday 29 December 2017 – Last day for receipt of postal votes
 Sunday 21 February 2018 – Last day for return of writs

As at least 33 days must elapse between the issue of a writ and the date of a by-election, the earliest Saturday that the by-election could take place was on 16 December.

Candidates

Events
Following the win by Barnaby Joyce in a similarly Section 44 triggered by-election in the Division of New England on 2 December 2017, the Liberal-National coalition maintained its one-seat majority in the Australian House of Representatives. However, a loss in Bennelong would have left the government reliant on crossbench support. Given this unusual opportunity for an Opposition to destabilise the government's position in parliament outside of a general election, the Labor Party chose former New South Wales Premier Kristina Keneally as a high-profile candidate.

In the months prior to the by-election, the 2017 Australian Marriage Law Postal Survey was conducted asking the question, "Should the law be changed to allow same-sex couples to marry?". Bennelong was among 12 of 47 federal electoral divisions in New South Wales and among 17 of 150 seats nationally to record a majority No response; with Yes on 49.8 percent and No on 50.2 percent, compared to the New South Wales result of Yes on 57.8 percent and No on 42.2 percent, and the national result of Yes on 61.6 percent and No on 38.4 percent. Parliament passed legislation to legalise same-sex marriage on 8 December 2017.

On 12 December 2017, Labor Senator Sam Dastyari announced his intention to resign from the Australian Senate, after weeks of controversy over his links and interactions with Chinese donors. Commentary deriving from Dastyari's statement was mixed, with some commentators signalling it might damage the Labor brand with voters right before they headed to the polls while others pointed to the large Chinese-Australian community in the electorate who might have got an impression that the government was pushing a "China-phobic narrative", given the pressure placed on Dastyari to resign in the weeks prior.

On 14 December 2017, it was revealed that Liberal candidate John Alexander had failed the requirement to declare rental income to the parliamentary register of members' interests from his $1440-a-day 100-acre $4.8-million property in the New South Wales Southern Highlands which he had purchased in June 2017.

Results

Previous incumbent and Liberal candidate John Alexander won the by-election despite a 4.8 percentage point two-party swing to Labor candidate Kristina Keneally which made the seat marginal.

Polling

See also
List of Australian federal by-elections

References

External links
2017 Bennelong by-election (Australian Electoral Commission)
2017 Bennelong by-election (ABC Elections)

2017 elections in Australia
December 2017 events in Australia
New South Wales federal by-elections